John Bradley Gambling (April 9, 1897 – November 21, 1974) was an American radio personality. He was a member of the Gambling family, 3 generations of whom—John B., John A. and John R.—were hosts of WOR Radio's (New York City, 710 AM) morning show Rambling with Gambling (now known as The John Gambling Show) over the course of over 75 years (1925–2000 and 2008–present).

Early years
As an adolescent in Cambridge, England, Gambling studied horticulture, planning to make a career in that field. Later, he joined the merchant marine and "became chief operator on the big passenger ships."

Radio
John B. was the host from 1925 to 1959, when he retired in favor of his son, John A. Gambling. With his Musical Clock, his all-in-fun setting-up exercises, cheerio music, wheezy gags, weather information and news scraps, John B. Gambling was a WOR fixture. Once he was a British seaman on a World War I mine sweeper.

John Gambling had a band, and provided live music, including the "March of the Seven Dwarfs," every morning at 7 am sharp.

Gambling bought a home in Teaneck, New Jersey in 1929.

References

American radio personalities
Radio pioneers
1897 births
1974 deaths
People from Teaneck, New Jersey